Thomas Havnegjerde (born 13 February 1962) is a Norwegian businessperson and since 2002 CEO of Flytoget.

Biography

Havnegjerde is educated as a siviløkonom in 1987 from the Norwegian School of Economics and Business Administration. He worked in Scandinavian Airlines System until 2001, where he had various positions. He was hired as commercial director of Flytoget in October 2001, and became CEO in July 2002. He became director of the kindergarten company Barnebygg Gruppen in 2008.

References

1962 births
Living people
Norwegian businesspeople
Norwegian School of Economics alumni
Norwegian people in rail transport